The CAF Women's Pre-Olympic Tournament determined the two participants representing the African continent in Football at the 2012 Summer Olympics. The competition was played as knockout tournament of four rounds.

Qualification

First round
First leg played on October 2, second leg played on October 23, 2010.

|}

Second round
The first leg was played on January 15, 2011, second leg on January 29, 2011.
The first leg of Guinea v Ghana was played on January 16, 2011.
The second leg of Ethiopia v Democratic Republic of Congo was played on January 30, 2011.

|}

Equatorial Guinea won on walkover.

Tunisia won 3–1 on aggregate.

Third round
The first leg was played on 1–3 April, second leg on 15–17 April.

|}

1 Equatorial Guinea were ejected from the competition for fielding an ineligible player, Jade Boho; Cameroon were advanced to the final round.

1–1 on aggregate. South Africa won 6–5 on penalties.

Final round
The two winners qualified for the 2012 Olympic Games.

The first leg was played on 27 August, second leg on 11 September and 22 October.

|}

See also
2012 CAF Men's Pre-Olympic Tournament

References

External links
FIFA Women's Olympic Football Tournament official website

Caf, Women
2011 in African football
CAF
2012